The Show Champion Chart is a record chart on the South Korean MBC M television music program Show Champion. Every week, the show awards the best-performing single on the chart in the country during its live broadcast.

In 2021, 32 singles ranked number one on the chart, and 23 music acts received an award trophy for this feat.

Starting from July 14, 2021, Show Champion began revealing scores like every other music program.

Chart history

Notes

References 

2021 in South Korean music
South Korea Show Champion
Lists of number-one songs in South Korea